Lars Lönnkvist (born 4 April 1957) is a Swedish orienteering competitor. He is Relay World Champion from 1979, as a member of the Swedish winning team. He also won silver medals in the 1978 and 1981 relays, and a bronze medal in 1983 and 1987. He placed fifth in the individual contest in the 1979 World Championships, and fourth in 1981.

References

1957 births
Living people
Swedish orienteers
Male orienteers
Foot orienteers
World Orienteering Championships medalists